Torgelow-Holländerei is a village and a former municipality in the Vorpommern-Greifswald district, in Mecklenburg-Vorpommern, Germany. Since 25 May 2014, it is part of the town Torgelow.

References

Vorpommern-Greifswald
Former municipalities in Mecklenburg-Western Pomerania